Horseshoe Bay is a summer village in Alberta, Canada. It is located on the northern shore of Vincent Lake, in the County of St. Paul No. 19.

Demographics 

The population of the Summer Village of Horseshoe bay according to its 2017 municipal census is 73.

In the 2016 Census of Population conducted by Statistics Canada, the Summer Village of Horseshoe Bay had a population of 49 living in 25 of its 88 total private dwellings, a  change from its 2011 population of 37.

See also 
List of communities in Alberta
List of summer villages in Alberta
List of resort villages in Saskatchewan

References

External links 

1985 establishments in Alberta
Summer villages in Alberta